Lester Warfel Brockelhurst, Jr. (1914 – March 18, 1938), known as The Crime Tourist, was an American spree killer who, together with his girlfriend Bernice Felton, killed at least three men in holdups during a six-week crime spree across multiple states in 1937. Found guilty of the final murder, Brockelhurst was executed at the Tucker Unit the following year.

Early life
Lester Jr. was born in Galesburg, Illinois, the first son of Mormon couple Lester Warfel Brockelhurst, Sr. and his wife Edyth (née DuPree). Another son, Karl, was born in 1930. Little is known about Lester's upbringing and early life, but after graduating from school, he took on a job as a teacher at a Sunday school in Galesburg. In 1935, he was arrested and convicted for armed robbery in Chicago, for which he served a two-year prison term at the Joliet Penitentiary. Brockelhurst was paroled in 1937 and went to Rockford, where he met 18-year-old Bernice Felton, who was also from Galesburg. The two quickly befriended and fell in love with each other, and on March 31 of that year, the couple embarked on a 18-state wide crime spree.

Murders and capture
On the same day as their sudden disappearance from the city, a 47-year-old local tailor named John Albin Theander disappeared along with his car. Some time later, his body was found on the outskirts of Rockford, with a single bullet hole in his head. After killing him, Brockelhurst and Felton travelled to Salt Lake City and then onto Dallas, before winding up in Fort Worth on April 28. There, they held up a tavern owned by a man named Jack Griffith, who attempted to defend his property from the two criminals. In response, Lester shot and killed him on the spot, and the couple fled the state. Their next destination was Little Rock, Arkansas, and on May 6, they ditched Theander's car and travelled to Memphis, Tennessee on foot. There, they were picked up by Victor A. Gates, a wealthy landowner who resided in Little Rock, who drove them there. When they reached Arkansas, Brockelhurst shot Gates in the head, robbed him of his money and valuables and then threw the body into a ditch.

From this point onward, the couple wandered around the country, committing about 40 robberies and hold-ups, but no other known murders were recorded. After robbing a bakery in Philadelphia, Brockelhurst and Felton arrived in Dutchess County, New York. On May 13, a state trooper named Joseph Hunt noted that their car was missing a license plate and stopped them. When he noticed that there was a loaded revolver in the car, he took the couple to Fishkill for further interrogation. Not long after his arrest, Brockelhurst admitted to being the outlaw who had been robbing various establishments in the past weeks, and additionally confessed to the three murders. The contemporary press likened the arrest to that of bank robber Merle Vandenbush, who had been arrested at nearby Katonah for a minor traffic violation.

Two days after his capture, a nervous Brockelhurst was detained in Poughkeepsie as officials from Illinois, Texas, Arkansas, New York and the Federal government were discussing on which jurisdiction would house and subsequently charge the accused with murder. Due to his frequent faintings, he had to be sedated by jail physician George E. Lane, who told the press that his behavior was caused by "overexcitement". While incarcerated at his jail cell, Sheriff Paul Johnson of the Rockford Police Department travelled to Poughkeepsie so he could interview Lester about his possible involvement in the murder of gas station operator Herman Luhrsen on February 12, in the small town of Rockton, which was located not far from Rockford. According to Johnson, Lurhsen had been murdered with the same type of gun used by Brockelhurst.

In the end, a decision by New York's then-governor, Herbert H. Lehman, concluded that Brockelhurst should be extradited to Arkansas and handed over to prosecutor George Hartje, reasoning that they had the strongest case against the killer. Brockelhurst had no objections over this, as he "wanted to get it over with" and was assured that in any case he would end up in the electric chair. Prosecutor Hartje publicly stated that he would demand the death penalty for both Brockelhurst and Felton, which prompted Abraham Felton, Bernice's father, to tell the press that his daughter had allegedly been told a sob story from Lester about how his parole officers were "hounding him" until he got married, and so, to get rid of them, he took her so they could get married.

Trial, sentence and execution

The pair's trial was scheduled for June 14, and was to take place in Lonoke, Arkansas. During this time, both Lester and Bernice were kept under suicide watch, as both had declared that if one of them took their life, the other would do the same. They were kept in separate cells, but were still allowed to share meals together under the prison guard's supervision. Twenty days before the trial was due to start, Brockelhurst's attorneys notified the Circuit Judge W. J. Waggoner that they would petition the Supreme Court to stop the trial, after their previous request for a 30-day continuance had been denied. On the eve of the trial, Lester and Bernice had a quarrel, and as a result, she was allowed to be present as a state witness against her former partner. Brockelhurst's attorneys' defense was based around the claim that their client was insane, but the prosecution countered their claims with an affidavit from the State Hospital for Nervous Diseases, which, upon examination, determined that the defendant was completely sane.

At the end of the trial, Lester Brockelhurst was found guilty of killing Victor Gates and sentenced to die in the electric chair. Upon hearing the verdict, he fainted and had to be carried to his cell while unconscious. His father, who was also present, also collapsed. The following day, Bernice Felton was also put on trial for the murder of Gates. Much to the public's dismay, after deliberating for only 80 minutes, Felton was acquitted of the murder charge and set free. She and her father were transported to stay the night at a tourist camp, as the locals were likely to attack them if they were seen on the streets.

While spared a murder conviction, Felton faced additional federal charges for transporting the stolen car of one Lester’s victim across state lines, from Arkansas to Tennessee. She was found guilty, and after the judge harshly admonished the jury that had acquitted her of murder, he sentenced her to the maximum term allowed for the charge, five years in prison. After her release, she married in 1948 and had a son in Baltimore in 1949; he died at age 16 in an automobile accident. After that marriage ended, she married again and became the mother of eight more children, but that marriage, too, ended in the early 1960s. Bernice herself lived until age 88, passing away in 2007. She was buried at Rockford, Illinois.

Over the following months, an appeal was lodged to the Supreme Court for the commutation of Brockelhurst's sentence, but on November 30, it was promptly shot down. Upon hearing of the decision, Lester received the news calmly, saying that nothing he could say would help him. While awaiting his execution at the Tucker Unit, Brockelhurst was interviewed about yet another murder, that of an unidentified man found dead in Poughkeepsie around the time that the pair were seen in the area.

On March 2, 1938, Brockelhurst's attorneys presented a petition, signed by two Little Rock doctors and more than 50 Galesburg residents, which claimed that Lester was mentally ill, and thus, ineligible for execution. Despite their last-ditch attempt, the Jefferson Circuit Court threw out the petition, thus confirming the death verdict for the final time. On March 18, Lester Brockelhurst was electrocuted at the Tucker Unit. Before being strapped to the chair, he gave a 12-minute statement, ending it with a rant about his affair with Bernice. His last words were reportedly the following:

References

1914 births
1938 deaths
20th-century American criminals
American male criminals
American spree killers
American people convicted of murder
American people convicted of robbery
People convicted of murder by Arkansas
20th-century executions by Arkansas
20th-century executions of American people
People executed by Arkansas by electric chair
Executed people from Illinois
Executed spree killers
Violence against men in North America
Criminals from Illinois
Latter Day Saints from Illinois
People from Galesburg, Illinois